Aliaksandr Padshyvalau (born 8 March 1996) is a Belarusian handball player for HC Meshkov Brest and the Belarusian national team.

He participated at the 2017 World Men's Handball Championship.

References

External links

1996 births
Living people
Sportspeople from Minsk
Belarusian male handball players
Expatriate handball players
Belarusian expatriate sportspeople in Germany
Handball-Bundesliga players